A list of highest points in Belgium by province, regions and communities of Belgium.

Provinces

Regions

Communities

Notes

Highest Points
highest points
Geography of Belgium